Zhou Bangxin (born December, 1935), academician of the Chinese Academy of Engineering (CAE), professor of material science and engineering at Shanghai University.

References

1935 births
Living people
Academic staff of Shanghai University
Scientists from Suzhou
Educators from Suzhou
Members of the Chinese Academy of Engineering
Chinese materials scientists
20th-century Chinese engineers